George Aaron Hirsch (born June 21, 1934), is a magazine publisher, a founder of the New York City Marathon, a candidate for United States Congress and a television commentator. Hirsch was the founding publisher of New York, New Times and The Runner magazines. Hirsch was also the worldwide publisher of Runner’s World, the first publishing director of Men's Health and the publisher of La Cucina Italiana. He is currently the chairman of the board of the New York Road Runners.

Early life, education and family 

Hirsch was born in New York City and grew up in New Rochelle where he attended public schools. He graduated from Princeton University in 1956 with a BA in history (magna cum laude) and the Harvard Business School in 1962. He served as a naval officer on an LST home ported in Naples, Italy from 1957 to 1960. He and Shay Scrivner were married in 1989, the second marriage for each of them. He has two sons, David and William. He also has two stepsons, Ian Scrivner and Sean Scrivner.

Publishing career
Hirsch spent five years at Time–Life International from 1962 to 1967 becoming assistant publisher of Life International and Life en Espanol in 1965. In 1967, he joined Clay Felker to prepare for the launch of New York magazine as president and publisher. The first issue was published in April 1968. In 1973, he founded New Times magazine which he published until it folded in 1979. While publishing New Times, Hirsch launched The Runner magazine in 1978. In January 1987, Rodale, Inc. acquired The Runner and merged it with Runner’s World, where he became worldwide publisher after launching a number of international editions of the magazine. Hirsch was also the first publishing director of Men's Health and director of international magazines, positions he held until his retirement from Rodale in 2004. From 2005 to 2011, he was the chairman and publisher of La Cucina Italiana, the English language edition of Italy’s oldest and largest food and cooking magazine.

Running 

Hirsch helped Fred Lebow start the five-borough New York City Marathon in 1976 to celebrate the nation’s bicentennial. With the success of the first race, it became an annual event that has become one of the world’s leading sporting events. In 1979, Hirsch founded the Midnight Run in New York’s Central Park, a race that is held every New Year’s Eve. From 1984 to 1986, Hirsch was the on air host of a weekly segment on ESPN's SportsCenter called “The Runner’s Corner." He has done television commentary for many distance running events including the New York City, Boston, Los Angeles, San Francisco and Cincinnati (Flying Pig) marathons. He has also been a commentator for three Olympic Games: Los Angeles in 1984, Seoul in 1988 and Barcelona in 1992.
 
Beginning in Boston in 1969, Hirsch has run forty marathons with a personal best of 2:38 set in Boston in 1979 at the age of 44. He ran much of that race with Joan Benoit, who went on to win the first women’s Olympic marathon in 1984. In 2009, on a promise to his wife Shay, he ran his final marathon in New York at age 75. He won his age group in each of his last eight marathons. Hirsch became the chairman of the New York Road Runners in 2005. Each year in conjunction with the New York City Marathon, the George Hirsch Journalism Award is given to a writer who has made a significant contribution to the sport of running. In 2014, Hirsch was also the recipient of a lifetime achievement award from the Association of International Marathons and Distance Races, and in 2017 he was inducted into the Road Runners Club of America Hall of Fame.

Other 

Hirsch was the unsuccessful Democratic candidate for Congress in Manhattan’s Silk Stocking District in 1986. In 1988, he was a delegate at the Democratic National Convention. He has been on the board of Salon Media Group since 2000.  In 2003, Hirsch was the recipient of the National Distance Running Hall of Fame George Sheehan Journalism Award. In 2019, he was conferred the title of "Ufficiale dell’Ordine della Stella d’Italia" by the Republic of Italy  for his role as an ambassador of Italian culture, and was named USATF's 2019 Masters Athlete of the Year for the 85-89 age group.

External links
One Man's Vision: Footrace in Five Boroughs
 To the Loser Belongs Some Spoils
 Khannouchi's All-American Performance
 Bannister's Milestone Recalls a Different Era in Sport
 Fred Lebow's Great Race
 Grete Waitz and the Humanity of the Long-Distance Runner
 60 Years Ago, An Olympic Trifecta of Endurance
 Marathon Runners Build Their Sport Stride by Stride
100 Races Later, It's Still Boston
5 Boroughs. 26 Miles. Whose Crazy Idea Was This?
The First Five-Borough New York City Marathon
Remembering Roger Bannister, the First to Break a Four-Minute Mile
$2 and Some Pancakes Went Far at the 1969 Boston Marathon
George Hirsch has been running for 68 years
It Was 50 Years Ago Today, the Marathon Came to New York to Stay
70 Years Later, Bobby Thomson’s Homer Still Hurts
How the New York City Marathon Grew Up
CBS Mornings: George Hirsch reflects on baseball's "shot heard 'round the world"

References

1934 births
Living people
American male marathon runners
Businesspeople from New Rochelle, New York
American male journalists
Princeton University alumni
American publishers (people)
Harvard Business School alumni
Journalists from New York City
Track and field athletes from New York City